P. proximus may refer to:
 Pachybrachis proximus, a beetle species in the genus Pachybrachis
 Pagurus proximus, a crab species in the genus Pagurus
 Pirata proximus, a wolf spider species in the genus Pirata
 Polybetes proximus, a huntsman spider in the genus Polybetes

See also
 Proximus (disambiguation)